Boyles is a surname. Notable people with the surname include:

Erico Boyles Aumentado (1940–2012), former governor of Bohol, congressman, deputy speaker of the Philippine House of Representatives
Governor Boyles, one of the 44 barangays of the municipality of Ubay, in Bohol, named after Governor Boyles
Chris Boyles (born 1980), American decathlete
Denis Boyles, journalist, editor, university lecturer and the author/editor of several books
Devarr Boyles (born 1970), retired Bermudian professional football player and now manager
Edgar William Boyles (1921–2001), senior British civil servant who became Under-Secretary at the Inland Revenue (1975–81)
Emerson R. Boyles (1881–1960), American lawyer and judge
Harlan E. Boyles (1929–2003), politician and public servant, North Carolina State Treasurer (1977–2001)
Harry Boyles (1911–2005), pitcher in Major League Baseball
Kevin Boyles (born 1967), former volleyball player for Canada
Matthew Boyles (born 1982), American race walker
Peter Boyles (born 1943), radio talk show personality
William Boyles, Wisconsin Territory legislator
James Boyles Murray (1789–1866), businessman and leading member of New York society

See also
Boyle's law, an experimental gas law that describes how the pressure of a gas increases as the volume of its container decreases
Mount Boyles, the highest peak in the Thomas Mountains, located south of the Sweeney Mountains in Palmer Land
Boyles Chapel, North Carolina, small unincorporated community in Stokes County, North Carolina, United States
Earl Boyles Park in Portland, Oregon
Boyles Terminal Subdivision, railroad line owned by CSX Transportation in the U.S. State of Alabama
Boyelles
Boyes
Boyle
Broyles
Byles (disambiguation)